The 2018–19 Purdue Boilermakers women's basketball team represents Purdue University during the 2018–19 NCAA Division I women's basketball season. Boilermakers, led by 13th year head coach Sharon Versyp, play their home games at Mackey Arena and were a members of the Big Ten Conference. They finished the season 19–15, 8–10 in Big Ten play to finish in tie for tenth place. They advanced to the quarterfinals of the Big Ten women's tournament where they lost to Rutgers.

Roster

Schedule

|-
!colspan=9 style=| Exhibition

|-
!colspan=9 style=| Non-conference regular season

|-
!colspan=9 style=| Big Ten conference season

|-
!colspan=9 style=| Big Ten Women's Tournament

Rankings

See also
2018–19 Purdue Boilermakers men's basketball team

References

Purdue Boilermakers women's basketball seasons
Purdue
Purdue
Purdue